Dongji Island / Dongji Islet / Tungchi Island is an island in Dongji Village, Wangan Township, Penghu County (the Pescadores), Taiwan. Dongji Island has also been known as Nandongyu.

The island is the site of the Dongji Island Lighthouse (Dongji Lighthouse).

History

A temple for Wang Ye worship on the island was built during the Jiaqing era and restored in 1872.

Dongji Island Lighthouse was built in 1911 during the period of Japanese rule of Taiwan.
 

In June 2014, Dongji Island was made part of the new South Penghu Marine National Park.

In May 2016, a ferry service between Tainan and Dongji Island had its maiden voyage. The trip to Tainan takes about two and a half hours.

On July 1, 2016, the Hsiung Feng III missile mishap occurred in the waters southeast of Dongji Island.

In June 2017, a tornado-like twister was reported in the waters off Dongji Island, which is an occasional occurrence in the area's weather patterns.

On January 10, 2018, the Chia Ming Lun (嘉明輪) cargo ship ran aground and sank near Dongji Island. The ship and its cargo was left unsalvaged.

Geography
Dongji Island's village is located near the middle of the island in an area that was previously underwater. The smaller formerly inhabited Chutou Islet is located to the immediate northwest of Dongji Island.

Climate
Dongji Island has a tropical climate close to the humid subtropical boundary. Being an offshore island in the shallow Taiwan Strait, the location has lower diurnal temperature variation than either mainland Taiwan or the Asian continental landmass to its west. The island is also a lot drier and sunnier than the Taiwanese mainland. The vast majority of rain falls in summer as the East Asian monsoon penetrates the high-pressure systems otherwise dominating the area. Winters are dry with comfortable weather for outdoor activities, although cloudier than the low rainfall amounts would suggest.

Gallery

See also
 List of islands of Taiwan

References

External links

 【MIT台灣誌 #376】水藍草綠岩屋－澎湖望安東吉島 ('Made in Taiwan Annals of Taiwan #376: Blue Waters, Green Grass and Stone Caverns- Dongji Island, Wangan, Penghu') 

Islands of Taiwan
Landforms of Penghu County